The minority floor leader of the Senate, or simply the Senate minority floor leader, is the leader elected by the political party or coalition of parties that are not part of the majority bloc in the Senate of the Philippines. He serves as their official leader in the body and fulfills the responsibilities of a floor leader. He manages the business of the minority in the Senate. He is expected to defend the minority’s parliamentary rights, to criticize the policies and programs of the majority, and to use parliamentary tactics to defeat, pass, or amend legislation.

The incumbent minority floor leader of the Senate is Koko Pimentel.

List of minority floor leaders

See also
 Majority Floor Leader of the Senate of the Philippines

References
List of Senators of the Philippines

External links
Senate of the Philippines